Benewah County is a county located in the northwest part of the U.S. state of Idaho. As of the 2020 United States Census the county had a population of 9,530. The county seat and largest city is St. Maries, which has some area inside the Coeur d'Alene Reservation.

The county was established on January 23, 1915, of land partitioned from Kootenai County. It was named for a chief of the Coeur d'Alene Tribe. The federally recognized Coeur d'Alene Tribe is based on the Coeur d'Alene Reservation in this and neighboring Kootenai County.

Geography
Benewah County lies on the west line of the state. Its west boundary line abuts the east boundary line of the state of Washington. It is the northern part of the Palouse, a wide and rolling prairie-like region of the middle Columbia basin.

Adjacent counties

 Spokane County, Washington – northwest
 Kootenai County – north
 Shoshone County – east
 Latah County – south
 Whitman County, Washington – southwest

Major highways

  – US 95
  – SH-3
  – SH-5
  – SH-6
  – SH-58
  – SH-60

National protected area
 St. Joe National Forest (part)

State protected areas
 Heyburn State Park
 McCroskey State Park

Demographics

2000 census
As of the 2000 United States Census, there were 9,171 people, 3,580 households, and 2,538 families in the county. The population density was 12 people per square mile (5/km2).  There were 4,238 housing units at an average density of 6 per square mile (2/km2). The racial makeup of the county was 88.66% White, 0.12% Black or African American, 8.94% Native American, 0.15% Asian, 0.05% Pacific Islander, 0.25% from other races, and 1.82% from two or more races. 1.55% of the population were Hispanic or Latino of any race. 26.6% were of German, 11.7% English, 9.5% American and 8.6% Irish ancestry.

There were 3,580 households, out of which 31.30% had children under the age of 18 living with them, 58.40% were married couples living together, 7.70% had a female householder with no husband present, and 29.10% were non-families. 24.00% of all households were made up of individuals, and 10.40% had someone living alone who was 65 years of age or older. The average household size was 2.52 and the average family size was 2.99.

The county population contained 26.90% under the age of 18, 6.80% from 18 to 24, 25.40% from 25 to 44, 26.60% from 45 to 64, and 14.20% who were 65 years of age or older. The median age was 39 years. For every 100 females there were 104.00 males. For every 100 females age 18 and over, there were 101.10 males.

The median income for a household in the county was $31,517, and the median income for a family was $36,000. Males had a median income of $35,097 versus $20,288 for females. The per capita income for the county was $15,285. About 10.50% of families and 14.10% of the population were below the poverty line, including 18.20% of those under age 18 and 9.70% of those age 65 or over.

2010 census
As of the 2010 United States Census, there were 9,285 people, 3,837 households, and 2,571 families in the county. The racial makeup of the county was 86.6% white, 8.7% Native American, 0.3% black or African American, 0.3% Asian, 0.1% Pacific islander, 0.5% from other races, and 3.6% from two or more races. Those of Hispanic or Latino origin made up 2.5% of the population. In terms of European ancestry, 23.7% were German, 17.5% were Irish, 14.6% were English, 7.1% were Norwegian, and 3.4% were American.

Of the 3,837 households, 29.0% had children under the age of 18 living with them, 52.8% were married couples living together, 9.3% had a female householder with no husband present, 33.0% were non-families, and 27.3% of all households were made up of individuals. The average household size was 2.40 and the average family size was 2.90. The median age was 44.8 years.

The median income for a household in the county was $37,500 and the median income for a family was $41,759. Males had a median income of $37,214 versus $22,348 for females. The per capita income for the county was $18,312. About 11.2% of families and 15.2% of the population were below the poverty line, including 21.6% of those under age 18 and 5.6% of those age 65 or over.

Politics
Benewah County voters tend to vote Republican in the last several decades. In only two national elections since 1968 has the county selected the Democratic Party candidate (as of 2020).

Communities

Cities
 Plummer
 St. Maries
 Tensed

Census-designated places
 De Smet

 Fernwood

 Parkline

Unincorporated communities

 Alder Creek
 Benewah
 Cardwell
 Chatcolet

 Emida
 Flat Creek
 Hawleys Landing
 Lotus
 Mashburn
 Meadowhurst
 Miltown
 Mowry
 North South Ski Bowl
 Omega
 Pedee
 Plummer Junction
 Ramsdell
 Renfrew
 Riverdale
 Rocky Point
 Rover
 Saint Joe
 Sanders
 Santa
 Silvertip Landing
 Tyson Creek Station
 Wayland
 Willard

Images

See also
National Register of Historic Places listings in Benewah County, Idaho

Notes

 

 
Idaho counties
Idaho placenames of Native American origin
1915 establishments in Idaho
Populated places established in 1915